The Grenadian Coast Guard is one of two military branches in Grenada. The Coast Guard's role is search and rescue as well as drug interdiction. The Coast Guard falls under the command of the Commissioner of Police and has a total of 60 personnel in service operating 4 craft. The branches headquarters is located at Fort George.

Fleet

Patrol Boats
1 x U.S. Dauntless class
Grenadan patrol boat Levera (PB-02)
2 x U.S. Boston Whaler Series
3 x Defender-class patrol boats
PB05, PB06 and PB07

References

Wertheim, Eric. The Naval Institute Guide to Combat Fleets of the World, 2005-2006; Their Ships, Aircraft, and Systems. US Naval Institute Press. Annapolis, Maryland. 2005.

Government of Grenada
Military of Grenada